Jodha Bai or Jodh Bai may refer to:

 Mariam-uz-Zamani or Jodha Bai, chief Rajput wife and principal consort of Akbar
 Jagat Gosain or Jodh Bai, who was given the posthumous title of Bilqis Makani by Jahangir

Rajasthani folklore